Connection may refer to:

Mathematics
Connection (algebraic framework)
Connection (mathematics), a way of specifying a derivative of a geometrical object along a vector field on a manifold
Connection (affine bundle)
Connection (composite bundle)
Connection (fibred manifold)
Connection (principal bundle), gives the derivative of a section of a principal bundle
Connection (vector bundle), differentiates a section of a vector bundle along a vector field
Cartan connection, achieved by identifying tangent spaces with the tangent space of a certain model Klein geometry
Ehresmann connection, gives a manner for differentiating sections of a general fibre bundle
Electrical connection, allows the flow of electrons
Galois connection, a type of correspondence between two partially ordered sets
Affine connection, a geometric object on a smooth manifold which connects nearby tangent spaces
Levi-Civita connection, used in differential geometry and general relativity; differentiates a vector field along another vector field

Music
Connection (The Green Children album), 2013
Connection (Don Ellis album), 1972
Connection (Up10tion album), 2021
Connection (EP), a 2000 split EP by Home Grown and Limbeck
Connection, a 2019 EP by Seyong
"Connection" (Elastica song) (1994)
"Connection" (OneRepublic song) (2018)
"Connection" (Rolling Stones song) (1967)
"Connection", a 1976 song by Can from Unlimited Edition
"Connection", a song by Avail from Satiate

Other uses
Connection (film), a 2017 Konkani film in Goa
Connection (dance), a means of communication between the lead and the follow
Layover or connection, a transfer from one means of transport to another

See also
Connected sum
Connectedness
Connecting (TV series)
Connections (disambiguation)
Connexion (disambiguation)
Contiguity (disambiguation)
Database connection
Disconnection (disambiguation)
Link (disambiguation)
PC Connection, a Fortune 1000, National Technology Solutions Provider, based in Merrimack, New Hampshire
Rapport
Six degrees of separation
Telecommunication circuit, the complete path between two terminals
The Connection (disambiguation)
Virtual connection, also known as a virtual circuit